The C.710 were a series of light fighter aircraft developed by Caudron-Renault for the French Air Force just prior to the start of World War II. One version, the C.714, saw limited production, and were assigned to Polish pilots flying in France after the fall of Poland in 1939. A small number was also supplied to Finland.

Design and development
The original specification that led to the C.710 series was offered in 1936 in order to quickly raise the number of modern aircraft in French service, by supplying a "light fighter" of wooden construction that could be built rapidly in large numbers without upsetting the production of existing types. The contract resulted in three designs, the Arsenal VG-30, the Bloch MB.700, and the C.710. Prototypes of all three were ordered.

The original C.710 model was an angular design developed from an earlier series of air racers. One common feature of the Caudron line was an extremely long nose that set the cockpit far back on the fuselage. The nose housed the 336 kW (450 hp) Renault 12R-01, a supercharged inverted and air-cooled V-12 engine that resulted from putting together two 6Q engines. The aircraft was a monoplane of all-wooden construction. It had a fixed and spatted landing gear, and the vertical stabilizer was a seemingly World War I-era semicircle instead of a more common trapezoidal or triangular design. Armament consisted of a 20 mm Hispano-Suiza HS.9 cannon under each wing in a small pod, with 60 rounds per gun.

The C.710 prototype first flew on 18 July 1936. The prototype C.710 was destroyed in a crash on 1 February 1938.

The C.711 was a proposed racing aircraft, which was not built, while the C.712 was a version intended to break the World Air Speed Record. The C.712 made its first flight on 24 December 1936, but was destroyed in a crash at Istres on 29 April 1937, during a record attempt. The C.713, which flew on 15 December 1937, was a modified fighter that  introduced retractable landing gear and a more conventional triangular vertical stabilizer.

The final evolution of the 710 series was the C.714 Cyclone, a variation on the C.713 which first flew in April 1938 as the C.714.01 prototype. The primary changes were a new wing airfoil profile, a strengthened fuselage, and instead of two cannons, the fighter had four 7.5 mm MAC 1934 machine guns in the wing gondolas. It was powered by the newer 12R-03 version of the engine, which introduced a new carburettor that could operate in negative g.

The French Air Force ordered 20 C.714s on 5 November 1938, with options for a further 180. Production started at a Renault factory in the Paris suburbs in summer 1939.

Other projected versions were the C.720 trainer with a 75 or 164 kW (100 or 220 hp) engine, the C.760 fighter with a 559 kW (750 hp) Isotta-Fraschini Delta engine, and the C.770 fighter with a 597 kW (800 hp) Renault V-engine. None of these reached production.

Operational history

Deliveries did not start until January 1940. After a series of tests with the first production examples, it became apparent that the design was seriously flawed. Although light and fast, its wooden construction did not permit a more powerful engine to be fitted. The original engine seriously limited its climb rate and maneuverability with the result that the Caudron was withdrawn from active service in February 1940. In March, the initial production order was reduced to 90, as the performance was not considered good enough to warrant further production contracts. Eighty were diverted to Finland to fight in the Winter War. These were meant to be flown by French pilots.

However, events in France resulted in only six aircraft being delivered, and an additional ten were waiting in the harbour when deliveries were stopped. The six aircraft that arrived were assembled, tested and given registrations CA-551 to CA-556. The aircraft were found to be too unreliable and dangerous to use in Finnish conditions, and were not committed to combat. Two of the aircraft were damaged during a transport flight to Pori. Further, the Finnish pilots found that it was difficult to start and land the aircraft from the air bases at the front. The aircraft were maintained on the roster until they were retired and scrapped on 30 December 1949. One example, CA-556 was transferred to the maintenance personnel school as an instructional airframe.

On 18 May 1940, 35 Caudrons were delivered to the Polish Warsaw Squadron, the Groupe de Chasse polonais I/145, stationed at the Mions airfield. After just 23 sorties, adverse opinion of the fighter was confirmed by frontline pilots who expressed concerns that it was seriously underpowered and was no match for contemporary German fighters.

On 25 May, only a week after it was introduced, French Minister of War Guy La Chambre ordered all C.714s to be withdrawn from active service. However, since the French authorities had no other aircraft to offer, the Polish pilots ignored the order and continued to fly the Caudrons. Despite flying a fighter hopelessly outdated compared to the Messerschmitt Bf 109E, the Polish pilots scored 12 confirmed and three unconfirmed victories in three battles between 8 June and 11 June, losing nine in the air and nine more on the ground. Among the aircraft shot down were four Dornier Do 17 bombers, and also three Messerschmitt Bf 109 and five Messerschmitt Bf 110 fighters.

The Caudron fighter was also used by the Polish training squadron based in Bron near Lyon. Although the pilots managed to disperse several bombing raids, they did not score any kills; but they did not lose any aircraft either. By the end of June when France fell, only 53 production machines had been delivered (although the number varies, 98 is another common figure).

Operators

Finnish Air Force

French Air Force

Polish Air Force in Exile

Survivors
One full CR.714 airframe as well as one additional fuselage were preserved in Finland. The fuselage was offered back to the Musée de l'Air et de l'Espace where, as of 2015, it is currently undergoing restoration.

Specifications (Caudron C.714)

See also

References

Notes

Bibliography
 Angelucci, Enzo. The Rand McNally Encyclopedia of Military Aircraft, 1914–1980. San Diego, California: The Military Press, 1983.  .
 Belcarz, Bartłomiej. GC 1/145 in France 1940. Sandomierz, Poland/Redbourn, UK: Mushroom Model Publications, 2002. .
 Belcarz, Bartłomiej. Morane MS 406C1, Caudron Cyclone CR 714C1, Bloch MB 151/152 (Polskie Skrzydła 2) (in Polish). Sandomierz, Poland: Stratus, 2004. . (This book recounts the use of the CR.714 by Polish Pilots of the French Air Force.)
 Breffort, Dominique and André Jouineau. French Aircraft from 1939 to 1942, Volume 1: from Amiot to Curtiss. Paris: Histoire & Collections, 2004. .
 Brindley, John F. French Fighters of World War Two, Volume One. Windsor, UK; Hylton Lacy Publishers Ltd., 1971. .

 Green, William. War Planes of the Second World War, Fighters, Volume One. London: Macdonald & Co.(Publishers), 1960. .
 Green, William and Gordon Swanborough. The Complete Book of Fighters. New York: Smithmark, 1994. .
 Gretzyngier, Robert and Wojtek Matusiak. Polish Aces of World War II. Oxford, UK: Osprey Publishing., 1998. .
 Keskinen, Kalevi, Kari Stenman and Klaus Niska. Suomen Ilmavoinen Historia 4: Morane-Saulnier M.S. 406/Caudron C.714 (in Finnish). Helsinki, Finland: Tietoteos, 1975. .

 Pelletier, Alain. French Fighters of World War II in Action (Aircraft Number 180). Carrollton, Texas: Squadron/Signal Publications, Inc., 2002. .

External links

 Photo gallery of Finnish Caudron C.714
 replica of Caudron Cyclone

Conventional landing gear
Single-engined tractor aircraft
World War II French fighter aircraft
Low-wing aircraft
1930s French fighter aircraft
C.714
Aircraft first flown in 1936
World War II aircraft of Finland